Yadegarlu (also Romanized as Yādegārlū) is a Kurdish village in Almahdi Rural District, Mohammadyar District, Naqadeh County, West Azerbaijan Province, Iran. At the 2006 census, its population was 607, in 137 families.

References 

Populated places in Naqadeh County